The 2005 Wests Tigers season was the 6th in the joint-venture club's history. They competed in the NRL's 2005 Telstra Premiership, captained by Mark O'Neill and Scott Prince and coached by Tim Sheens. The Tigers finished the regular season in 4th position before reaching the 2005 NRL grand final, their first. After a Clive Churchill Medal-winning performance by Prince, Wests won and claimed their maiden premiership.

Minor Premiership 

The Tigers started the season at long odds for the 2005 premiership. The team had never qualified for a final series and had a relatively inexperienced squad. The season kicked off with a home game against Parramatta. The game turned when fullback Brett Hodgson had to leave the field with an eye injury. Two late tries allowed the Eels to wrap up the game. For Round 2 the team had a bye. In round 3 against defending premiers, the Bulldogs, the Tigers trailed 0–12 and 6–18 before scoring thirty unanswered points to lead 36–18 with 10 minutes remaining. The Bulldogs, inspired by Braith Anasta, fought back to tie the game 36–36. With extra time seeming inevitable, a Dogs' error gave the Tigers possession and, with seconds remaining, a Scott Prince field goal gave the side its first win. In Round 4 the Tigers beat the other 2004 grand finalists with a hard fought 26–16 win. A win followed against New Zealand in the rain in Christchurch (a Tigers home game).

In rounds 6–9 the team lost four games in a row despite often being competitive. The losing streak ended against the winless Newcastle Knights. During rounds 11–15 the Tigers remained in the bottom half of the table mixing promising wins with heavy defeats. They then shocked the league by going on a club record eight game winning streak. With victory against the Cowboys they guaranteed their first ever finals appearance. The winning streak included a club record 54–2 win over defending premiers, the Bulldogs. Despite losses in the final two games the Tigers finished in the top four and earned a home semi-final.

Season results

Players used

Ladder

Finals Series 

The Tigers played their first ever semi-final against fifth placed North Queensland Cowboys, a team who had played in the 2004 final series. After a tight opening, the Tigers ran riot to score a 50–6 win. Both teams qualified for week two with the Tigers meeting six time premiers the Brisbane Broncos in a knock-out game. The Broncos dominated early possession with Benji Marshall preventing a Darren Smith try before scoring a long range intercept try against the run of the play. Towards the end of the game the Tigers kicked clear to win comfortably. The win saw the Tigers meet the Dragons in a Grand Final qualifier. In the lead up to the game there was controversy over the venue with calls for the game to be moved from Aussie Stadium to the much larger Telstra Stadium. As the Dragons had qualified for this game after week one their fans had an extra week to buy tickets to the game. As a result, the majority of the capacity crowd were Dragons fans. An early Marshall try gave the Tigers a lead they never gave up. The 20-12 win meant the Tigers qualified for the Grand Final.

The Tigers scored the most points ever in a finals series, with 134, beating the Brisbane Broncos 1998 NRL finals season record of 124 points. As of 2021, this record stands.

2005 Grand Final 

Both the Cowboys and the Wests Tigers were playing in their first ever grand final. The Cowboys scored early and led 6–0. A Cowboys error allowed Bryce Gibbs to score a try to level the game. In a game defining moment, Benji Marshall returned a kick beating several defenders before a flick pass to Pat Richards. Richards, who needed an injection to overcome a leg injury, pushed away from Rod Jensen to score, the Tigers leading 12–6 at the break. After half time Anthony Laffranchi crashed over the try-line for an 18–6 lead before the Cowboys hit back. A Daniel Fitzhenry try gave the Tigers a 24–12 lead. With two minutes to go the Cowboys crossed the try-line wide but the conversion attempt missed, leaving the score at 24–16. A try on full-time to Todd Payten saw a final scoreline of 30–16.

References 

Wests Tigers seasons
Wests Tigers season